Andy J. Wellings is a professor in the Computer Science department at the University of York in northern England.  He works closely with Alan Burns on real-time systems, distributed, concurrent and real-time programming languages.

Andy Wellings is a member of the team responsible for the creation of the Real-time specification for Java. He is also an Ada programming language expert.

Books 
Wellings has written a number of books on programming, especially in Ada.

References

External links 
 Andy Wellings's departmental home page
 Personal home page
 
 
 Andy Wellings, Scientific Commons
           Andy Wellings, LinkedIn

Year of birth missing (living people)
Living people
Academics of the University of York
English computer scientists
Computer science writers
Programming language designers